John Roberts (14 July 1835 – 24 February 1894), was a Welsh Liberal Party politician.

Roberts was the son of David Roberts. His father, who was born in Llanrwst Wales, moved to Liverpool at an early age, where he built up a successful timber business, and later settled in Abergele. Roberts was educated at Brighton. He was a magistrate for Denbighshire  and constructed the mansion of Bryngwenallt in Abergele.

In a by-election in 1878, Roberts was elected to the House of Commons as the Member of Parliament (MP) for Flint Boroughs. He held the seat until 1892.

Roberts died two years later at the age of 58.

Roberts married Katharine Tudor Hughes, daughter of Rev. John Hughes, of Liverpool. Their son John became a Liberal politician and was created Baron Clwyd in 1919.

References

Kidd, Charles, Williamson, David (editors). Debrett's Peerage and Baronetage (1990 edition). New York: St Martin's Press, 1990.

External links
 

1835 births
1894 deaths
Liberal Party (UK) MPs for Welsh constituencies
UK MPs 1874–1880
UK MPs 1880–1885
UK MPs 1885–1886
UK MPs 1886–1892